Danielle Bounds holds the title of Miss Earth United States 2010 and placed in the Top 14 at the Miss Earth 2010 pageant.

Background
Danielle was born on Easter Sunday April 22, 1984. She says "I was born for the title of Miss Earth United States", since her birthday falls on the international holiday Earth Day every year. Bounds graduated from a private non-denominational high school in 2002 and was her graduating class valedictorian. The 6-foot tall beauty queen is an avid business woman with her friend and business partner Ashley Litton. Together they co-operate a prom and pageant boutique named Sassy Chic in Leawood, Kansas. They are the evening gown sponsors for several Miss USA states. Danielle and Ashley met at the Miss Missouri USA 2005 pageant where Ashley was giving up her title and Danielle was a competitor for the first time. Danielle's evening gown for the Miss Earth 2010 competition in Vietnam was personally designed by Ashley through her line named A.Renee.

Miss Earth United States
She had placed 1st runner-up at the Miss Earth United States 2009 pageant and received the title of United States Miss Air. She also placed as 4th runner-up to Jana Murrell at the 2008 pageant and received the title of United States Miss Eco. After crowned Miss Earth United States 2010, she represented for United States at Miss Earth 2010 in Nha Trang, Vietnam and placed Top 14.

Miss Missouri USA
Prior to competing at Miss Earth United States, she had competed regularly at the Miss Missouri USA pageant. Her best placement was in 2005, when she was 1st runner-up to Andrea Ciliberti.  She was also 2nd runner-up to Stacey Smith in 2009 and received the Interview Award.

References

1984 births
Living people
People from Kansas City, Missouri
Miss Earth 2010 contestants
Miss Earth United States delegates